Leo Parker (April 18, 1925 – February 11, 1962) was an American jazz musician, who primarily played baritone saxophone.

Early life 
Born in Washington, D.C., Parker studied alto saxophone in high school and played this instrument on a recording with Coleman Hawkins in 1944.

Career 
Parker switched to baritone saxophone in 1944 when he joined Billy Eckstine's bebop band, playing there until 1946. In 1945, he was a member of the "Unholy Four" of saxophonists, with Dexter Gordon, Sonny Stitt and Gene Ammons. He played on 52nd Street in New York with Dizzy Gillespie in 1946 and Illinois Jacquet in 1947-48, and later recorded with Fats Navarro, J.J. Johnson, Teddy Edwards, Wardell Gray and Charles Thompson. He and Thompson had a hit with their Apollo Records release, "Mad Lad".

Personal life 
In the 1950s, Parker had problems with drug abuse, which interfered with his recording career. He made two comeback records for Blue Note in 1961, but the following year he died of a heart attack in New York City. He was 36.

Discography
Billy in the Lion's Den (King, 1957) with Bill Jennings
Let Me Tell You 'Bout It (Blue Note, 1961)
Rollin' with Leo (Blue Note, 1961)
With Coleman Hawkins
Rainbow Mist (Delmark, 1944 [1992]) compilation of Apollo recordings
With Illinois Jacquet
The Kid and the Brute (Clef, 1955)
Illinois Jacquet / Leo Parker -- Toronto 1947 (Uptown Records 2013)
Jumpin' at Apollo (Delmark, 2002)
With Dexter Gordon
 Dexter Rides Again (Savoy, 1945–1947 [1958])

References
Footnotes

General references
[ Leo Parker] at AllMusic
LeoParkerMusic.com - Fully detailed chronology, discography and biographical information.

1925 births
1962 deaths
20th-century American saxophonists
American jazz saxophonists
American male saxophonists
Savoy Records artists
United Records artists
Blue Note Records artists
Chess Records artists
Jazz baritone saxophonists
Musicians from Washington, D.C.
20th-century American male musicians
American male jazz musicians